The 2021 Reigate and Banstead Borough Council election took place on 6 May 2021 to elect members to Reigate and Banstead Borough Council in England coinciding with other local elections.

Results summary

Ward results

Banstead Village

Chipstead, Kingswood and Woodansterne

Earlswood and Whitebushes

Hooley, Merstham and Netherne

Horley Central and South

Horley East and Salfords

Horley West and Sidlow

Lower Kingswood, Tadworth and Walton

Meadvale and St. John's

Nork

Redhill East

Redhill West and Wray Common

Reigate

South Park and Woodhatch

Tattenham Corner and Preston

References

Reigate and Banstead
May 2021 events in the United Kingdom
2021
2020s in Surrey